Vandana Jain is an Indian Cornea, Cataract and Lasik Eye Specialist. She is the founding Director of Advanced Eye Hospital and Institute in Navi Mumbai.

Medical Training 
Vandana was born and brought up in New Delhi. She received her undergraduate medical training from the prestigious Maulana Azad Medical College. She went on to pursue her residency in Ophthalmology from the Guru Nanak Eye Centre which is affiliated with Maulana Azad Medical College. Medical further completed a long term fellowship in Anterior segment services from the prestigious LV Prasad Eye Institute, Hyderabad.

Publications 
 Vandana has over 30 national and international peer reviewed publications. 
 Being one of the few ophthalmologists to have received training exclusively in corneal diseases, she is oft quoted in leading newspapers and magazines.
 She is also a columnist for Deccan Herald, a leading Indian newspaper.
 She is also a health expert and columnist for DNA - Daily News and Analysis; a Mumbai-based English daily.

References 

Indian ophthalmologists
Women ophthalmologists
Indian women surgeons
20th-century Indian women scientists
Living people
Year of birth missing (living people)
Medical doctors from Delhi
Indian surgeons
20th-century Indian medical doctors
20th-century women physicians
20th-century surgeons